Nagai Station is the name of two train stations in Japan:

 Nagai Station (Osaka) (長居駅)
 Nagai Station (Yamagata) (長井駅)